Gamma Canis Majoris (γ Canis Majoris, abbreviated Gamma CMa, γ CMa), also named Muliphein , is a star in the constellation of Canis Major. It is unclear exactly why this relatively faint star was given the 'gamma' designation, but possibly because it is in the same part of the constellation as Sirius (alpha) and Mirzam (beta).

Nomenclature
γ Canis Majoris (Latinised to Gamma Canis Majoris) is the star's Bayer designation.

It bore the traditional name Muliphein, not to be confused with Muhlifain, which is Gamma Centauri; both names derive from the same Arabic root, محلفين muħlifayn. In 2016, the International Astronomical Union organized a Working Group on Star Names (WGSN) to catalogue and standardize proper names for stars. The WGSN approved the name Muliphein for this star on 21 August 2016 and it is now so entered in the IAU Catalog of Star Names.

Properties
Gamma Canis Majoris is a blue-white B-type bright giant with a stellar classification of B8II and an apparent magnitude of +4.11. It is approximately 440 light-years from Earth. It is a chemically peculiar Hg–Mg star displaying abnormal lines of mercury and magnesium.

This star is suspected of being a spectroscopic binary system, and there is a candidate companion at an angular separation of 0.332″ along a position angle of 114.8°. It is a member of the Collinder 121 open cluster.

Modern legacy
Muliphein appears on the flag of Brazil, symbolizing the state of Rondônia.

The US Navy cargo ship USS Muliphen (AKA-61) was named after the star.

References

Canis Majoris, Gamma
Canis Major
B-type bright giants
Muliphein
Canis Majoris, 23
034045
2657
053244
Durchmusterung objects